Victory Field is a former military airfield, located approximately  south-southwest of Vernon, Texas.  It was closed in 1945 at the end of World War II.

History
Part of the Army Air Corps build up for World War II, Victory Field was built and activated in 1941. It was assigned to the Air Corps Flying Training Command, Gulf Coast Training Center (later Central Flying Training Command).

The facility was a primary (stage 1) pilot training airfield operated under contract by Hunter Flying Service & Richey Flying Service. Fairchild PT-19s were the primary trainer at the airfield.  Thousands of cadets were trained and made their first solo flight at Victory Field.  As the Army Air Corps succeeded in Europe it decided to draw down training and scheduled the closure of Victory Field in 1945.

Current use
In 1950, it was a TYC unit, closing in 2010. It remains today the Adolescent Forensic Program for North Texas State Hospital.

See also
 Texas World War II Army Airfields
 31st Flying Training Wing (World War II)

References

 Shaw, Frederick J. (2004), Locating Air Force Base Sites History's Legacy, Air Force History and Museums Program, United States Air Force, Washington DC, 2004.

External links

1941 establishments in Texas
USAAF Contract Flying School Airfields
Airfields of the United States Army Air Forces in Texas
Buildings and structures in Wilbarger County, Texas
Post-World War II aircraft storage facilities
USAAF Central Flying Training Command
American Theater of World War II
World War II airfields in the United States